Alessandro Pellicori (born 22 July 1981) is a former Italian footballer and football coach. He played as a striker.

On 11 August 2012 he was suspended 3 year for alleged match-fixing.

Career
Pellicori started his professional career at Cosenza then Lecce. He made his Serie A debut on 14 January 2001 against Vicenza. Lecce loaned him to various Serie C1 clubs until settled in Grosseto.

Pellicori signed for Piacenza of Serie B in summer 2006, but he was signed by Serie B rival Cesena on 31 January 2007. On 22 August, he moved to newly promoted Serie B team Avellino. He scored 18 goals but could not avoid the team finished as the top of the four relegated teams. On 29 July 2009 Queens Park Rangers signed Pellicori on a free transfer until June 2012. He scored his first goal for QPR in a first round League Cup tie at Exeter City on 11 August 2009. However, he failed to score in the league and joined Mantova on loan in January 2010. In August 2010, he penned a season long loan deal at Torino.

References

External links

Player profile on TuttoMantova.it

1981 births
Sportspeople from Cosenza
Living people
Association football forwards
Italian footballers
Italian expatriate footballers
Expatriate footballers in England
Italian expatriate sportspeople in England
Cosenza Calcio 1914 players
U.S. Lecce players
U.S. Avellino 1912 players
S.S.D. Varese Calcio players
Calcio Foggia 1920 players
Benevento Calcio players
F.C. Grosseto S.S.D. players
Piacenza Calcio 1919 players
A.C. Cesena players
Queens Park Rangers F.C. players
Mantova 1911 players
Torino F.C. players
Serie A players
Serie B players
Serie C players
English Football League players
Mediterranean Games silver medalists for Italy
Mediterranean Games medalists in football
Competitors at the 2001 Mediterranean Games
U.S. Castrovillari Calcio players
Footballers from Calabria